Tatlow may refer to:

People
 Edward Tatlow, a member of the Derbyshire County Cricket Club in 1873
 Mark Tatlow, artistic director of the Drottningholm Palace Theatre
 Robert Garnett Tatlow (1855–1910), Irish-Canadian businessman
 Ruth Tatlow (born 1956; née Ballard), British-Swedish musicologist
 Sarah Alexandra Tatlow, a British politician who stood for the 2017 Lincolnshire County Council election
 Tissington Tatlow, first General Secretary of the Student Christian Movement of Great Britain 
 William Nevin Tatlow Hurst (1868–1946), Australian civil servant, Tasmanian Surveyor-General

Fictional characters
 Steph Tatlow, a character from British TV drama Doctors
 Sgt. William Tatlow, a character from the 1951 film Lost Continent

Places
 Mount Tatlow, a mountain in British Columbia, Canada
 Tatlow Creek, Vancouver, British Columbia, Canada, a buried creek; see 
 Tatlow Creek, Squamish, Coastal, British Columbia, Canada; a white water river, and tributary to Ashlu Creek
 Tatlow Lake, source of Tatlow Creek, tributary of Ashlu Creek
 Tatlow, a community in British Columbia, Canada

See also